Tyler S. Moselle is a former Acting Executive Director and research associate of the Carr Center for Human Rights Policy of the Kennedy School of Government at Harvard University.  He was educated at Brigham Young University, where he received a bachelor's degree in Middle Eastern and African history, and Harvard, where he received a master's in politics. His master's thesis Natural Evil in Politics, has been referenced in a 2010 philosophy symposium in Colombia. and was published by the Carr Center in 2007.

According to the journalist and writer Nathan Hodge, Moselle played a primary role in promoting the human rights elements of America's COIN doctrine while he was at the Carr Center, where he focused on national security and human rights.

Moselle has argued against the U.S. surge in Afghanistan for Harvard International Review, criticized the militarization of U.S. foreign policy in an op-ed for the Financial Times, published research about Afghanistan as well as the concept of world order in global political theory, and has written three academic reviews for Human Rights & Human Welfare.  In addition, he has been interviewed about humanitarianism, the American military's counterinsurgency training, and international justice.

References
Notes

External links
 Carr Center for Human Rights Policy

Harvard Kennedy School faculty
Living people
Harvard University alumni
Brigham Young University alumni
Year of birth missing (living people)